Solonytsivka is an urban-type settlement in Kharkiv Raion of Kharkiv Oblast in Ukraine. It is located on the banks of the Udy, in the drainage basin of the Don. Solonytsivka hosts the administration of Solonytsivka settlement hromada, one of the hromadas of Ukraine. Population: 

Until 18 July 2020, Solonytsivka belonged to Derhachi Raion. The raion was abolished in July 2020 as part of the administrative reform of Ukraine, which reduced the number of raions of Kharkiv Oblast to seven. The area of Derhachi Raion was merged into Kharkiv Raion.

Economy

Transportation
Zarichanka railway station is located in the settlement. It is on the railway line connecting Kharkiv and Zolochiv which continues across the Russian border to Gotnya.

Solonytsivka has road access to Kharkiv.

References

Urban-type settlements in Kharkiv Raion